Mouna Sabri (born 2 February 1984) is a former Moroccan tennis player, who played at the Morocco on the Fed Cup in 2003.

Sabri has a career-high ITF juniors ranking of 577, achieved on 3 January 2000.

She played at Drury University, in 2007 won Great Lakes Valley Conference player of the year award.

National representation

Fed Cup
Sabri made her Fed Cup debut for Morocco in 2003, while the team was competing in the Europe/Africa Zone Group II, when she was 19 years and 87 days old.

Fed Cup (0–1)

Doubles (0–1)

References

External links
 
 
 

1984 births
Living people
Moroccan female tennis players
College women's tennis players in the United States
Drury Panthers athletes
21st-century Moroccan women